Hope Springs may refer to:

 Hope Springs (TV series), a BBC One comedy-drama series set in Scotland
 Hope Springs (2003 film), romantic-comedy starring Colin Firth, Minnie Driver, and Heather Graham
 Hope Springs (2012 film), romantic comedy-drama starring Meryl Streep, Tommy Lee Jones, and Steve Carell
 Miss Hope Springs, cabaret stage name of British composer, lyricist, pianist and singer Ty Jeffries

See also
 Hope Springs Eternal (disambiguation)